Kim Koivu (born 11 April 1991) is a Finnish professional golfer who plays on the European Tour. He won three times on the 2018 Challenge Tour.

Amateur career
Koivu attended Georgia Southern University from 2013 to 2015, having previously attended Brevard College for two years. Koivu played on the Nordic Golf League as an amateur during 2017. At the end of the season, he qualified for the final stage of the European Tour Q-school. He turned professional at the end of the season.

Professional career
Koivu's success in reaching the final stage of the Q-school gained him entry to 2018 Challenge Tour events. He won his second event, the Belt & Road Colorful Yunnan Open, won again later in the season at the Vierumäki Finnish Challenge, where he beat Robert MacIntyre at the first hole of a playoff, and then won the Rolex Trophy two weeks later. His three wins earning him an immediate promotion to the European Tour.

Amateur wins
2011 Fall LMU Invitational
2012 Cherokee Valley Invitational, Aramark Collegiate Invitational
2013 Irish Creek Intercollegiate

Professional wins (7)

Challenge Tour wins (3)

1Co-sanctioned by the China Tour

Challenge Tour playoff record (1–0)

Finnish Tour wins (4)

Team appearances
Amateur
European Amateur Team Championship (representing Finland): 2015, 2016
Eisenhower Trophy (representing Finland): 2016

See also
List of golfers to achieve a three-win promotion from the Challenge Tour
2018 Challenge Tour graduates

References

External links

Finnish male golfers
Georgia Southern Eagles
Brevard Tornados athletes
Sportspeople from Helsinki
1991 births
Living people
21st-century Finnish people